Igor Yaroslavovych Vovchanchyn (born August 6, 1973) is a retired Ukrainian mixed martial artist and kickboxer, who competed in early no holds barred MMA contests. After making his professional MMA debut in 1995, he won nine openweight mixed martial arts tournaments (back when tournament format required 3 to 4 consecutive bare-knuckle fights during the same night), 3 superfights, holds the second longest unbeaten streak in MMA (at 37 fights,) and is the second most successful MMA fighter ever by number of wins achieved by way of knockout. Vovchanchyn has an MMA tournament named after him, the Igor Vovchanchyn Cup.

Biography
The son of Kladiya (née Michaylovna) and Yaroslav Iosifovich Vovchanchyn, Igor Yaroslavovych Vovchanchyn was born in the settlement of Fesky, in the Zolochevsky district of Soviet Ukraine. Vovchanchyn said that growing up, he caused trouble and got into street fights and different kinds of mischief. Due to his antics, there was a popular story in circulation that whenever Vovchanchyn became upset the villagers would ring a bell in the center of town which would alarm everyone to stay in their houses until he had calmed down. Vovchanchyn later stated that this story was just a joke, although there was a bell in the center of town. At age 17, he moved to Kharkiv and began competing in track and field, running the 100m dash and throwing the discus. Due to his love for fighting, he later moved to boxing under trainer Oleg Ermakov. In 1993, he met Eugenia Borschevskaya, general secretary of the All Eurasian Kickboxing Federation. After taking up kickboxing, he later went to Denmark to compete at the World Kickboxing Amateur Championships with the Ukrainian national team, where he became the world champion that same year. Vovchanchyn also won the Commonwealth of Independent States (CIS) kickboxing championship in 1994.

Mixed martial arts career

Early career

Honour of the Warrior
In late 1995, Vovchanchyn transitioned from a successful kickboxing career to MMA after being invited to participate at Honour of the Warrior in Kharkiv, Ukraine. In this 8-man tournament, Vovchanchyn knocked out his first two opponents before losing via submission to Ukrainian sambist Andrey Besedin in the final.

International Absolute Fighting Council
He then fought a month later in a 32-man tournament held at Moscow's Luzhniki Palace of Sports, performing impressively at the inaugural International Absolute Fighting Council event, where he TKO'd Sergei Akinen before defeating Adilson Lima, a Gracie Jiu Jitsu black belt who trained with Ryan Gracie. Vovchanchyn won by knockout via soccer kick 56 seconds into the fight, but Lima's cornerman Renzo Gracie argued to the tournament organisers, complaining that kicks to a downed opponent were unfair and demanded an instant rematch. Unusually, an immediate rematch was granted, and the fight began again only to be stopped a second time after Lima's nose was broken by a punch, giving Vovchanchyn the win by TKO. Vovchanchyn advanced to the quarterfinal, in which he was submitted by Russian sambo champion Mikhail Ilyukhin.

Mr. Strongman SEKAI

With his dominant kickboxing style, Vovchanchyn became famed for being one of the few strictly stand-up fighters to overcome grappling-based opponents, exemplified in his victory in the 8-man Mr. Strongman Sekai tournament in Minsk, Belarus on January 23, 1996, where he knocked out three opponents.

March 1996
In March 1996, Vovchanchyn fought in and won 3 different tournaments: the 
DNRF: Ukrainian Octagon, the UCMAL: Ukrainian No Rules Championship, and the first ever IFC event: IFC 1: Kombat in Kyiv. Across these three tournaments, he won 9 fights (7 KO/TKO's and 2 submissions) with none of them going past the first round. At the IFC tournament, all three men he faced in the same night (Fred Floyd, Paul Varelans and John Dixon) weighed over 300 pounds/136 kilograms. The fight against Paul Varelans was considered one of the greatest fights in European MMA history. In attendance at this event, was former heavyweight boxing champion Leon Spinks, who was a 'guest of honor'.

UFC Invitation
Vovchanchyn was invited to fight at UFC 11 in September 1996, but could not participate due to visa issues as well as dissatisfaction with the offer.

Subsequent victories
Having achieved much success competing in the former Soviet Union, Vovchanchyn then won the 1st Absolute Fighting World Cup Pankration tournament in Tel Aviv, Israel on 12 November 1997. In the tournament final, Vovchanchyn faced Nick Nutter, an NCAA All-American Wrestler from Ohio State and a protégé of Mark Coleman. Nutter dominated the fight for approximately 25 minutes, until he was stunned by a head butt from Vovchanchyn. Bleeding heavily, Nutter submitted.

World Vale Tudo Championship
As a seven-time winner of various tournaments, Vovchanchyn was invited to compete in the fifth edition of the World Vale Tudo Championship (WVC), organised by Brazilian promoter Frederico Lapenda and hosted by the Fun House Night Club in Recife, northeast Brazil on 3 February 1998. The event featured an elimination tournament of eight fighters – three Americans, four Brazilians, and Vovchanchyn as the sole Ukrainian representative – without gloves and with 10-minute rounds. After forcing Chinese boxing stylist Tulio Palhares to submit to strikes in the quarterfinals, Vovchanchyn was scheduled to face Patrick Smith at the semifinal stage. Smith withdrew, however, after breaking his hand against Marco Selva, and he was replaced by local fighter Elias Rodrigues, also known as Demonio Negro ("Black Devil"). In a back-and-forth encounter that lasted over ten minutes, Vovchanchyn and Rodrigues traded strikes, although the Ukrainian was able to score four takedowns. In one of these opportunities, Vovchanchyn mounted Rodrigues and forced his Brazilian opponent to submit to a barrage of punches. Advancing to the final, he faced the American wrestler Nick Nutter in a rematch and scored a brutal 14-second knockout when he countered a takedown attempt with a well-timed knee strike.

Vovchanchyn won eight MMA tournaments during this stage of his career, and was considered arguably the best heavyweight in the world for several years to come. He returned to the WVC the following year, knocking out Edson Carvalho, a member of the Brazilian national judo team and a Carlson Gracie black belt. Carvalho was a disciple of Sebastião "Master of Death" Lacerda, a wealthy man from the north of Brazil who appeared in Rio de Janeiro in 1996 claiming to have spent a long period of time in Japan learning "the deadly art of yawara." Despite his dubious credentials, Lacerda was able to recruit some established competitors into his sect, including Carvalho and Marco Ruas. While Ruas ultimately parted ways with Lacerda, Carvalho continued to challenge other fighting styles on behalf of Lacerda and his "deadly technique" of yawara.

PRIDE FC

Early PRIDE career
After winning at World Vale Tudo Championship 5, Vovchanchyn was invited to Japanese promotion PRIDE, fighting Gary Goodridge in his debut. Vovchanchyn was taken down twice by the larger Goodridge and was left behind on points, but he dominated Goodridge during the stand-up exchanges and knocked him out with two left hooks, 5:58 into the first round.

Vovchanchyn returned to the World Vale Tudo Championship, winning two superfights against Aloisio Freitas Neto and Edson Carvalho.

Once again in PRIDE, Vovchanchyn then fought Japanese fighter Akira Shoji. Most of the fight stayed in the standing position, with Vovchanchyn damaging a wary Shoji and throwing him down, while the Japanese circled him and lied on the mat to avoid his hits. At the end Vovchanchyn won the judges decision by damaging Shoji badly with strikes.

In what was Vovchanchyn's last venture for some time outside of PRIDE, he participated in another 4-man tournament called 'InterPride' in his home country of Ukraine, winning the first fight via TKO and the final by submission.

Coming back to PRIDE, he fought Carlos "Carlão" Barreto, a Carlson Gracie team member and reigning IVC Heavyweight Champion. Despite the larger height of Barreto, Vovchanchyn countered him with punches and leg kicks and shut down his takedown attempts for the first two rounds, but action was slow and often saw Barreto as the most active fighter. Come the overtime, they traded hits and Barreto managed to take Vovchanchyn down, ending the fight working ground and pound on him. The decision was given to Vovchanchyn, which was met with a certain controversy.

After the Barreto match, Vovchanchyn made a special appearance in K-1 for a kickboxing rules match, facing multiple champion and established star Ernesto Hoost. The format impaired Vovchanchyn, who often found himself going for takedowns, while Hoost kept attacking his left leg with low kicks. At the end, the Ukrainian fighter fell down thrice due to the damage to his leg, which cost him the match by knockout.

Unofficial #1 Heavyweight Superfight
Vovchanchyn was next matched up with American wrestler Mark Kerr for the unofficial title of #1 heavyweight in the world. Nearly all outlets that covered mixed martial arts considered either Vovchanchyn or the unbeaten two-time UFC Champion and ADCC Champion Mark Kerr as the best heavyweight fighter in the world. Early in the fight, Kerr cut Vovchanchyn with a knee strike to the right eye and secured several takedowns, but he was unable to pass Vovchanchyn's guard or do any more significant damage. In the last round, Vovchanchyn pounced on the now-exhausted Kerr and dominated him with strikes, eventually knocking him out with a series of knees. Vovchanchyn was declared the winner, but the result was later overturned and the result declared a no contest. Knees to the head of a grounded opponent in the four points position had been banned just prior to the event. This fight was also the first time Vovchanchyn's manager, Eugenia Borschevskaya, was seen in his corner.

Bueno knockout
In his next fight, Vovchanchyn fought Brazilian jiu-jitsu master Francisco Bueno. Vovchanchyn knocked Bueno out with a vicious combination, Bueno literally falling face first as he was being punched in the face. This knockout is still to this day considered one of the most brutal knockouts in the history of MMA – it even prompted the promoters of K-1 to give him $1,000 cash in the locker room and propose that he fought K-1 Champion Ernesto Hoost. After this string of victories, Vovchanchyn became a huge favorite going into the Pride Grand Prix 2000.

PRIDE Openweight Grand Prix 2000
Vovchanchyn had been considered the top fighter in the sport for some years, and as commentators Stephen Quadros and Bas Rutten stated, he was likely the favorite to win the tournament. In the opening round he defeated Japanese professional wrestler Alexander Otsuka by decision and, in a rematch with Gary Goodridge, decisively won by knockout in an entirely stand-up fight.  He reached the final of the PRIDE 2000 Openweight Grand Prix.

Vovchanchyn then faced the number one pound for pound fighter in the world, Kazushi Sakuraba of Japan, who had beaten Royce Gracie earlier that night in a 90-minute bout, the longest in recent competitive fighting history. Though Sakuraba took him down and punched him, Vovchanchyn eventually grabbed a waist lock takedown and controlled the Japanese with strikes while Sakuraba covered up. After the fight was declared a draw and needed a second round to determine a finalist, Sakuraba's corner threw in the towel as he had just fought for 105 minutes and could not physically continue. Vovchanchyn won the fight via TKO (corner stoppage) and advanced to the last round.

Vovchanchyn met powerhouse American wrestler Mark Coleman in the final. Coleman had the advantage, coming into the final match, as he bypassed the semi finals after his opponent, Kazuyuki Fujita, retired due to injury. Coleman kept the visibly tired Igor on the ground, and during the second 20-minute round, finished the fight by gaining a north-south position and repeatedly kneed Vovchanchyn the head, forcing Vovchanchyn to tap out. Igor later said that Coleman was the toughest opponent he faced up to that point.

Post Grand Prix
Facing Japanese gatekeeper Daijiro Matsui at PRIDE 9, Vovchanchyn controlled the bout by sprawling and performing ground and pound on him, until the fight was stopped by eye damage on Matsui.

Vovchanchyn then fought Enson Inoue at PRIDE 10 in what was one of the most one sided fights in MMA history, which resulted in a doctor stoppage after the end of the 1st round. Inoue later recounted of the fight, "I sustained a broken jaw, fractured finger, perforated eardrum, swollen brain, a liver count 2000x the normal person and spent 2 days in intensive care." Vovchanchyn then faced off against Nobuhiko Takada at PRIDE 11, who was the trainer of Sakuraba and Matsui. Vovchanchyn was taken down and met leg kicks and some resistance, but he finished him on the second round via ground and pound.

After three straight victories, Vovchanchyn received a rematch with Mark Kerr at PRIDE 12. Vovchanchyn's advantage in the stand up fighting was countered by Kerr's superior grappling and takedowns, and the fight was ruled a draw after two rounds. After an extra, third round, Vovchanchyn was awarded the victory via unanimous decision. Igor cited both of his fights against Mark Kerr as the most difficult wins of his career.

PRIDE decline

2001
Although he was scheduled to face Ken Shamrock at Pride 13, Vovchancyn faced Tra Telligman, as Shamrock had sustained a neck injury 2 weeks prior to the fight. Despite Igor being able to counterstrike, Telligman surprised him with a left straight which knocked Vovchanchyn down, allowing Tra control the rest of the fight and win the decision. This was the first time Vovchanchyn had been out-struck.

He later faced another feared striker, former RINGS Openweight champion Gilbert Yvel at PRIDE 14. However, sensing Gilbert was weaker than him on the ground, Vovchanchyn took him down, putting his sambo skills to use and choking Yvel out.

Vovchanchyn would go to defeat another striker, beating world karate champion Masaaki Satake by decision at PRIDE 15.

In PRIDE 17, Vovchanchyn suffered another upset when was submitted in under three minutes by Brazilian Top Team trainer Mario Sperry. After this bout, he was invited to fight at the RINGS promotion, in Lithuania. Vovchanchyn's original opponent pulled out of the event with an injury, and was replaced by a fighter who "hadn't fought for quite a while". This fighter requested that no punches be allowed in the fight, which Igor said was difficult to avoid, but won via leg kicks in the second round.

He ended the year on a high note; showing great grappling expertise against Valentijn Overeem at PRIDE 18, escaping from heel hook attempts and slipping his own heel hook for the tap out, ending 2001 with a mixed record in PRIDE – going 3–2.

2002–2003
At the start of 2002, Vovchanchyn considered moving down to the Middleweight (205lb) division, and stated he thought he had a good chance to become a champion in that weight class. This move did not happen, and he faced Heath Herring at PRIDE 19, struggling in a fight which saw both grappling and striking from the two men, but after Herring accidentally headbutted Vovchanchyn at the third round, he was controlled by him, and judges gave the decision to Heath. Fighting Quinton Jackson would be similarly unfortunate for Vovchanchyn, as the American fighter slammed him twice, getting him submitted due to injury at PRIDE 22.

After beating Bob Schrijber by submission in a Dutch promotion, Vovchanchyn faced off against Mirko Cro Cop in August 2003. Igor was knocked out via left head kick. This fight is considered a 'passing of the torch', as Vovchanchyn had split his last 8 fights in Pride with a record of 3–5 (1–3 in his last 4), and it elevated the newer striking sensation Cro Cop into an Interim Heavyweight Championship fight with Antônio Rodrigo Nogueira.

2004
Breaking his losing streak at the start of 2004, Vovchanchyn defeated former King of the Cage Super Heavyweight champion Dan Bobish and was announced as one of the participants of PRIDE's upcoming 16-man heavyweight Grand Prix, but withdrew due to injury. Vovchanchyn went on to fight Katsuhisa Fujii at the end of the year.

Drop to Middleweight (93 kg)
In 2005, Vovchanchyn moved down a weight division - beating former Pancrase Heavyweight champion Yoshiki Takahashi. Takahashi said after the fight, "I've never been knocked out by a single punch until today, I'm still dizzy and have [a] headache." After this victory, he entered PRIDE's 2005 Middleweight Grand Prix. PRIDE commentator Bas Rutten believed that Vovchanchyn was a favorite to win the tournament.

PRIDE Middleweight Grand Prix 2005

Vovchanchyn was matched against Yuki Kondo - the reigning Pancrase Light Heavyweight champion and former two-time Pancrase Openweight champion – in PRIDE Total Elimination 2005. Vovchanchyn controlled the fight, winning a unanimous decision.

He then fought Alistair Overeem in the quarter finals and lost via submission. Vovchanchyn received a second chance to progress when offered a fight against Kazuhiro Nakamura in PRIDE Final Conflict 2005, with the winner earning the right to be an alternate in the finals of the tournament. After 15 minutes, Vovchanchyn lost a unanimous judges' decision in what would be his last competitive MMA fight.

On his move down to the Middlweight division, Vovchanchyn said, "It's all about training. I was 93 kg only for the last two years in PRIDE when they introduced weight divisions. But actually my natural weight is around 103-104 kg. Losing weight I didn't feel myself as strong as before. But 104 kg is the best weight for me and I am really comfortable about it. I felt strong, powerful, full of energy. Due to losing weight I felt lack of self-confidence. By the way the same goes for Fedor (Emelianenko), when he lost the weight, he felt out of his comfort zone. It's not about the shape and visual muscular performance but it was not his style." Regarding Vovchanchyn's weight, popular nutritionist Mike Dolce stated that he wished he could've helped Vovchanchyn drop to the 170 lb weight-class and make him the 'welterweight Fedor'. Some experts say that Vovchanchyn ideally should have fought at the Welterweight (183) division that PRIDE had, and that he was an undersized heavyweight.

Retirement
Although he was rumored to fight at PRIDE 34 against Wanderlei Silva, Vovchanchyn retired at age 32, citing multiple injuries, including a right hand that remained seriously affected as of 2008. It has been speculated that due to this injury, his last few performances in his career were passive. He finished his career in PRIDE with a record of 18–8 with 1 no contest, having the second most bouts in PRIDE history (27), second most wins in PRIDE history, and third most wins via KO/TKO (10). Vovchanchyn is considered one of MMA's hardest punchers, one of the best fighters in history to have never competed in the UFC, one of the greatest European mixed martial artists ever, and one of the best mixed martial artists of the 1990s. He was a top 10 heavyweight from April 1996 to January 2001 according to FightMatrix. In 2011 and in 2017, Vovchanchyn received several votes on Sherdog's 'MMA's All-Time Heavyweights' list.

Potential return to MMA
In July 2009, Vovchanchyn was linked to making his return in MMA at the Fighting Mixed Combative event in South Korea, which was scheduled for September 29, 2009. Although Jan Nortje was rumored to be his opponent, Vovchanchyn had just stated one year prior that he had no interest in fighting due to his injuries. The event took place and Igor did not appear on the card.

In September 2016, Rizin Fighting Federation CEO Nobuyuki Sakakibara posted several photos on his Instagram account, showing Vovchanchyn training in his gym back in Ukraine – even hinting that he may invite Igor back to fight in Japan.

Fighting style
Primarily a striker, Vovchanchyn based his MMA game around his punching power, which made him to be considered one of the most devastating strikers of his time. His Kickboxing utilized an ample pattern of looping punches, among them the casting punch, and he specialized in an aggressive counterpunching style in order to make up for his short reach. Vovchanchyn also displayed significant grappling skills, utilizing his sambo background, and would work a vicious ground and pound offense with short and hard strikes from the top. He was able to surprise many with his defensive guard and dexterity on the ground despite being known primarily as a striker, and displayed this ability against submission fighters such as Carlos Barreto, Mark Kerr and Valentijn Overeem among others.

Despite his small size, Vovchanchyn was known for his toughness and strength, leading Nobuhiko Takada to call him a "strongman". Vovchanchyn would later state that his punching power and fighting skills came naturally, not because of the martial arts, even though martial arts helped him along the way.
He also never invited any famous fighters to spar and train with him as he did not see the point in copying their styles.
He trained with many of the same coaches his entire career.
Vovchanchyn was known to take on any challenger, despite size or rules, even fighting in prison when he was not even a prisoner himself.

Personal life
Vovchanchyn is married and has one daughter, named Zlata. He identifies himself as neither Russian nor Ukrainian, but as a Slav. He is close friends with Fedor Emelianenko.

In a 2008 interview, Vovchanchyn stated that since retiring from competition he runs a local café-bar called 'Champion'.

Championships and accomplishments

Mixed martial arts 
 Ukrainian Combat Martial Arts League
Honour of the Warrior Runner-up (1995)
 Ukrainian No Rules Championship Champion (1996)
 Mr. Strongman SEKAI
 Mr. Strongman SEKAI Champion (1996)
 Donetsk No Rules Fighting
 Ukrainian Octagon Champion (1996)
 Ukrainian Octagon 2 Champion (1996)
 International Fighting Championship
 International Fighting Championship 1 Champion (1996)
 International Absolute Fighting Council
 1st Absolute Fighting World Cup Pankration Champion (1997)
 Absolute Fighting Championship 2 Superfight Champion (1997)
 Absolute Fighting Russian Open Cup 3 Champion (1997)
 World Vale Tudo Championship
 World Vale Tudo Championship 5 Tournament Champion
 WVC 6 Super Fight Champion (one time)
 WVC 7 Super Fight Champion (one time)
 InterPride
 InterPride 1999: Heavyweight Final Champion (1999)
 PRIDE Fighting Championship
 2000 PRIDE Openweight Grand Prix Runner-Up
 Second most bouts in PRIDE history (27)
 Second most wins in PRIDE history (18)
 Third most wins via KO/TKO in PRIDE history (10)

Kickboxing
63 Fights, 61 Wins, 2 Losses
 World Kickboxing Amateur Championships Winner - Denmark (1993)
 Commonwealth of Independent States (CIS/USSR) Kickboxing Champion (1994)

Mixed martial arts record 

|-
| Loss
| align=center| 56–10 (1)
| Kazuhiro Nakamura
| Decision (unanimous)
| PRIDE Final Conflict 2005
| 
| align=center| 2
| align=center| 5:00
| Saitama, Japan
| 
|-
| Loss
| align=center| 56–9 (1)
| Alistair Overeem
| Submission (standing guillotine choke)
| PRIDE Critical Countdown 2005
| 
| align=center| 1
| align=center| 1:25
| Saitama, Japan
| 
|-
| Win
| align=center| 56–8 (1)
| Yuki Kondo
| Decision (unanimous)
| PRIDE Total Elimination 2005
| 
| align=center| 3
| align=center| 5:00
| Osaka, Japan
| 
|-
| Win
| align=center| 55–8 (1)
| Yoshiki Takahashi
| KO (punch)
| Pride 29: Fists of Fire
| 
| align=center| 1
| align=center| 1:10
| Saitama, Japan
| 
|-
| Win
| align=center| 54–8 (1)
| Sergey Terezimov
| Submission (heel hook)
| WOP: Water of Peresvit
| 
| align=center| 1
| align=center| 1:35
| Kyiv, Ukraine
| 
|-
| Win
| align=center| 53–8 (1)
| Katsuhisa Fujii
| KO (punches)
| Pride Bushido 5
| 
| align=center| 1
| align=center| 4:02
| Osaka, Japan
| 
|-
| Win
| align=center| 52–8 (1)
| Dan Bobish
| TKO (punches)
| Pride 27: Inferno
| 
| align=center| 2
| align=center| 1:45
| Osaka, Japan
| 
|-
| Loss
| align=center| 51–8 (1)
| Mirko Cro Cop
| KO (head kick)
| PRIDE Total Elimination 2003
| 
| align=center| 1
| align=center| 1:29
| Saitama, Japan
| 
|-
| Win
| align=center| 51–7 (1)
| Bob Schrijber
| Submission (rear-naked choke)
| It's Showtime 2003 Amsterdam
| 
| align=center| 2
| align=center| 4:05
| Amsterdam, Netherlands
| 
|-
| Loss
| align=center| 50–7 (1)
| Quinton Jackson
| TKO (injury)
| Pride 22: Beasts from the East 2
| 
| align=center| 1
| align=center| 7:17
| Nagoya, Japan
| 
|-
| Loss
| align=center| 50–6 (1)
| Heath Herring
| Decision (unanimous)
| Pride 19: Bad Blood
| 
| align=center| 3
| align=center| 5:00
| Saitama, Japan
| 
|-
| Win
| align=center| 50–5 (1)
| Valentijn Overeem
| Submission (heel hook)
| Pride 18: Cold Fury 2
| 
| align=center| 1
| align=center| 4:35
| Fukuoka, Japan
| 
|-
| Win
| align=center| 49–5 (1)
| Ricardas Rocevicius
| TKO (leg kicks)
| RINGS Lithuania: Bushido Rings 3
| 
| align=center| 2
| align=center| N/A
| Vilnius, Lithuania
| 
|-
| Loss
| align=center| 48–5 (1)
| Mario Sperry
| Submission (arm-triangle choke)
| Pride 17: Championship Chaos
| 
| align=center| 1
| align=center| 2:52
| Tokyo, Japan
| 
|-
| Win
| align=center| 48–4 (1)
| Masaaki Satake
| Decision (unanimous)
| Pride 15: Raging Rumble
| 
| align=center| 3
| align=center| 5:00
| Saitama, Japan
| 
|-
| Win
| align=center| 47–4 (1)
| Gilbert Yvel
| Submission (rear-naked choke)
| Pride 14: Clash of the Titans
| 
| align=center| 1
| align=center| 1:52
| Yokohama, Japan
| 
|-
| Loss
| align=center| 46–4 (1)
| Tra Telligman
| Decision (unanimous)
| Pride 13: Collision Course
| 
| align=center| 3
| align=center| 5:00
| Saitama, Japan
| 
|-
| Win
| align=center| 46–3 (1)
| Mark Kerr
| Decision (unanimous)
| Pride 12: Cold Fury
| 
| align=center| 3
| align=center| 5:00
| Saitama, Japan
| 
|-
| Win
| align=center| 45–3 (1)
| Nobuhiko Takada
| TKO (submission to punches)
| Pride 11: Battle of the Rising Sun
| 
| align=center| 2
| align=center| 5:17
| Osaka, Japan
| 
|-
| Win
| align=center| 44–3 (1)
| Enson Inoue
| TKO (doctor stoppage)
| Pride 10: Return of the Warriors
| 
| align=center| 1
| align=center| 10:00
| Tokyo, Japan
| 
|-
| Win
| align=center| 43–3 (1)
| Daijiro Matsui
| TKO (doctor stoppage)
| Pride 9: New Blood
| 
| align=center| 1
| align=center| 5:03
| Nagoya, Japan
| 
|-
| Loss
| align=center| 42–3 (1)
| Mark Coleman
| TKO (submission to knees)
| rowspan=3| PRIDE Grand Prix 2000 Finals
| rowspan=3| 
| align=center| 2
| align=center| 3:09
| rowspan=3| Tokyo, Japan
| 
|-
| Win
| align=center| 42–2 (1)
| Kazushi Sakuraba
| TKO (corner stoppage)
| align=center| 1
| align=center| 15:00
| 
|-
| Win
| align=center| 41–2 (1)
| Gary Goodridge
| TKO (punches)
| align=center| 1
| align=center| 10:14
| 
|-
| Win
| align=center| 40–2 (1)
| Alexander Otsuka
| Decision (unanimous)
| PRIDE Grand Prix 2000 Opening Round
| 
| align=center| 1
| align=center| 15:00
| Tokyo, Japan
| 
|-
| Win
| align=center| 39–2 (1)
| Francisco Bueno
| KO (punches)
| Pride 8
| 
| align=center| 1
| align=center| 1:23
| Tokyo, Japan
| 
|-
| NC
| align=center| 38–2 (1)
| Mark Kerr
| NC (overturned)
| Pride 7
| 
| align=center| 2
| align=center| N/A
| Yokohama, Japan
| 
|-
| Win
| align=center| 38–2
| Carlos Barreto
| Decision (split)
| Pride 6
| 
| align=center| 3
| align=center| 5:00
| Yokohama, Japan
| 
|-
| Win
| align=center| 37–2
| Vepcho Bardanashvili
| Submission (guillotine choke)
| rowspan=2| InterPride 1999: Heavyweight Final
| rowspan=2| 
| align=center| 1
| align=center| N/A
| rowspan=2| Kharkov, Ukraine
| 
|-
| Win
| align=center| 36–2
| Vladimir Solodovnik
| TKO (punches)
| align=center| 1
| align=center| N/A
|
|-
| Win
| align=center| 35–2
| Akira Shoji
| Decision (unanimous)
| Pride 5
| 
| align=center| 2
| align=center| 10:00
| Nagoya, Japan
| 
|-
| Win
| align=center| 34–2
| Edson Carvalho
| TKO (punches)
| WVC 7: World Vale Tudo Championship 7
| 
| align=center| 1
| align=center| 3:16
| Brazil
| 
|-
| Win
| align=center| 33–2
| Aloisio Freitas Neto
| TKO (submission to punches)
| WVC 6: World Vale Tudo Championship 6
| 
| align=center| 1
| align=center| 7:26
| Brazil
| 
|-
| Win
| align=center| 32–2
| Gary Goodridge
| TKO (punches)
| Pride 4
| 
| align=center| 1
| align=center| 5:58
| Tokyo, Japan
| 
|-
| Win
| align=center| 31–2
| Nick Nutter
| KO (knee)
| rowspan=3| WVC 5: World Vale Tudo Championship 5
| rowspan=3| 
| align=center| 1
| align=center| 0:14
| rowspan=3| Recife, Brazil
| 
|-
| Win
| align=center| 30–2
| Elias Rodrigues
| TKO (submission to headbutt and punches)
| align=center| 1
| align=center| 10:35
|
|-
| Win
| align=center| 29–2
| Tulio Palhares
| TKO (submission to punches)
| align=center| 1
| align=center| 5:35
|
|-
| Win
| align=center| 28–2
| Nick Nutter
| TKO (submission to headbutts)
| rowspan=3| IAFC - 1st Absolute Fighting World Cup Pankration
| rowspan=3| 
| align=center| 1
| align=center| 24:42
| rowspan=3| Tel Aviv, Israel
| 
|-
| Win
| align=center| 27–2
| Mikhail Avetisyan 
| Decision (split)
| align=center| 1
| align=center| 35:00
| 
|-
| Win
| align=center| 26–2
| Valery Pliev
| TKO (submission to punches)
| align=center| 1
| align=center| 7:13
|
|-
| Win
| align=center| 25–2
| Yuri Mildzikhov
| TKO (forfeit)
| N/A
| 
| align=center| 1
| align=center| N/A
| Donetsk, Ukraine
|
|-
| Win
| align=center| 24–2
| Igor Guerus
| TKO (punches)
| N/A
| 
| align=center| 1
| align=center| N/A
| Donetsk, Ukraine
| 
|-
| Win
| align=center| 23–2
| Vasily Kudin
| TKO (submission to leg kicks)
| IAFC: Absolute Fighting Russian Open Cup 3
| 
| align=center| 1
| align=center| 9:11
| Luzhniki Sports Palace, Moscow, Russia
|
|-
| Win
| align=center| 22–2
| Dimitry Panfilov
| TKO (punches)
| rowspan=2| COS: Cup of Stars
| rowspan=2| 
| align=center| 1
| align=center| N/A
| rowspan=2| Odessa, Ukraine
| 
|-
| Win
| align=center| 21–2
| Aslan Hamza
| KO (knee)
| align=center| 1
| align=center| N/A
|
|-
| Win
| align=center| 20–2
| Leonardo Castello Branco
| Decision (split)
| IAFC: Absolute Fighting Championship II [Day 2]
| 
| align=center| 1
| align=center| 35:00
| Luzhniki Sports Palace, Moscow, Russia
|
|-
| Win
| align=center| 19–2
| Sergei Bondarenko
| TKO (punches)
| N/A
| 
| align=center| 1
| align=center| N/A
| Kharkiv, Ukraine
| 
|-
| Win
| align=center| 18–2
| Igor Akhmedov
| Submission (choke)  
| DNRF: Ukrainian Octagon 2
| 
| align=center| 1
| align=center| N/A
| Donetsk, Ukraine
| 
|-
| Win
| align=center| 17–2
| John Dixson
| TKO (exhaustion)
| rowspan=3| IFC 1: Kombat in Kyiv
| rowspan=3| 
| align=center| 1
| align=center| 9:10
| rowspan=3| Kyiv, Ukraine
| 
|-
| Win
| align=center| 16–2
| Paul Varelans
| KO (punches)
| align=center| 1
| align=center| 6:20
|
|-
| Win
| align=center| 15–2
| Fred Floyd
| TKO (submission to strikes)
| align=center| 1
| align=center| 13:14
| 
|-
| Win
| align=center| 14–2
| Igor Akhmedov
| Submission (arm-triangle choke)
| rowspan=3| UCMAL: Ukrainian No Rules Championship 1996
| rowspan=3| 
| align=center| 1
| align=center| N/A
| rowspan=3| Kyiv, Ukraine
| 
|-
| Win
| align=center| 13–2
| Yuri Zhernikov
| TKO (punches)
| align=center| 1
| align=center| N/A
|
|-
| Win
| align=center| 12–2
| Matrosov Matrosov
| TKO (punches)
| align=center| 1
| align=center| N/A
|
|-
| Win
| align=center| 11–2
| Igor Guerus
| TKO (punches)
| rowspan=3| DNRF: Ukrainian Octagon
| rowspan=3| 
| align=center| 1
| align=center| 1:41
| rowspan=3| Donetsk, Ukraine
| 
|-
| Win
| align=center| 10–2
| Sergey Sheremet
| KO (punch)
| align=center| 1
| align=center| 1:27
|
|-
| Win
| align=center| 9–2
| Oleg Tischenko
| KO (punch)
| align=center| 1
| align=center| 0:05
|
|-
| Win
| align=center| 8–2
| Roman Tikunov
| KO (punch)
| rowspan=3| MPS 1996: Mr. Strongman SEKAI 1996
| rowspan=3| 
| align=center| 1
| align=center| 2:21
| rowspan=3| Minsk, Belarus
| 
|-
| Win
| align=center| 7–2
| Sergei Bondarovich
| KO (head kick)
| align=center| 1
| align=center| 2:27
|
|-
| Win
| align=center| 6–2
| Nikolai Yatsuk
| KO (punch)
| align=center| 1
| align=center| 1:50
|
|-
| Loss
| align=center| 5–2
| Mikhail Ilyukhin
| Submission (chin to the eye)
| rowspan=4| IAFC: Absolute Fighting Championship I: Tournament
| rowspan=4| 
| align=center| 1
| align=center| 6:30
| rowspan=4| Luzhniki Sports Palace, Moscow, Russia
| 
|-
| Win
| align=center| 5–1
| Adilson Lima
| TKO (corner stoppage)
| align=center| 1
| align=center| 1:51
|
|-
| Win
| align=center| 4–1
| Adilson Lima
| KO (soccer kicks)
| align=center| 1
| align=center| 0:56
| 
|-
| Win
| align=center| 3–1
| Sergei Akinen
| TKO (arm injury)
| align=center| 1
| align=center| 2:40
|
|-
| Loss
| align=center| 2–1
| Andrei Besedin
| Submission (kneebar)
| rowspan=3| UCMAL: Warrior's Honour 1
| rowspan=3| 
| align=center| 1
| align=center| 1:12
| rowspan=3| Kharkiv, Ukraine
| 
|-
| Win
| align=center| 2–0
| Sergei Bondarovich
| TKO (punches)
| align=center| 1
| align=center| 0:18
|
|-
| Win
| align=center| 1–0
| Alexander Mandrik
| TKO (submission to punches)
| align=center| 1
| align=center| 3:06
|

Kickboxing record (Incomplete)

|-
|
|Loss
| Ernesto Hoost
|K-1 Dream '99
|Nagoya, Japan
|TKO (low kicks/3 knockdowns)
| style="text-align:center;"|3
| style="text-align:center;"|0:51
|61–2
|-
| colspan=9 | Legend:

References

External links
 
 Igor Vovchanchyn profile at Pride FC official website
 

1973 births
Living people
Ukrainian male kickboxers
Heavyweight kickboxers
Ukrainian male mixed martial artists
Light heavyweight mixed martial artists
Heavyweight mixed martial artists
Mixed martial artists utilizing sambo
Mixed martial artists utilizing boxing
Mixed martial artists utilizing kickboxing
Ukrainian sambo practitioners
Sportspeople from Kharkiv Oblast